Atzelberg Tower ( "Atzel Mountain Tower"), also known as Atzelberg Observation Tower for long, was a  German wooden lattice observation tower that was located on the summit of the  mountain of Atzelberg. The Atzelberg Tower had a floor count of 6 floors including both the ground floor and the top. The tower also had a roof which measured  from the ground. The observation tower's top floor can only be reached through its 150-stepped staircases. The tower was used from the year of its construction, 1980, until 5 August 2008, when it was ravaged by fire that was caused by arson, as an observation tower on the top of the Atzelberg, which provided viewers and/or observers a good view of the surrounding areas.

History

The Atzelberg Tower's construction was commenced in 1980, finishing the construction in the same year. The tower was then destroyed 28 years later, specifically, on 5 August 2008, by fire that was caused by arson, since the number of criminals and vandals that year also rose.

Geography

The Atzelberg Tower was situated on the summit of the  mountain, Atzelberg, which in turn is located in the town of Kelkheim, in the kreis (district) of Main-Taunus, in the state of Hesse, in Germany.

Gallery
Click on the thumbnail to enlarge.

See also

Lattice tower
List of tallest towers in the world
Kelkheim
Atzelberg

References

External links

Atzelberg Tower (Kelkheim (Taunus),1980) | Structurae
Atzelberg | Frankfurt 360° - swivelling city views
Kugelblick.de >> Atzelberg - December 2006 and August 2008 >> wwp0612

Towers completed in 1980
Observation towers in Hesse
Buildings and structures demolished in 2008